West Milton can refer to:

West Milton, Dorset
West Milton, New York
West Milton, Ohio